Amram Aburbeh (1892– 1966), also spelled Abourabia and Aburabia, was the Chief Rabbi of the Sephardic congregation in Petah Tikva, Israel and author of Netivei Am, a collection of responsa, sermons, and Torah teachings.

Biography
Amram Aburbeh was born on March 16, 1892 (17 Adar 5652) in Tétouan, Morocco. During his youth, he studied in Midrash Shlomo, a beit midrash (study hall) run by his father, Rabbi Shlomo Aburbeh. His mother was Yocheved Khalfon.

In 1906 Aburbeh immigrated to Palestine with his paternal grandparents, Rabbi Yosef and Billiada Aburbeh. The rest of the family followed them 7 years later, settling in the Jewish Quarter of the Old City of Jerusalem. Here Aburbeh's father held a yeshiva in his home called Or Zaruaa. Aburbeh studied in the Touvy Yisba'u yeshiva of the Ma'araviim congregation until 1910. He later studied in the Porat Yosef Yeshiva. He received rabbinical ordination from his teacher, Rabbi Yosef Haim HaCohen, president and Rabad (chief judge) Rosh Av Beit Din of the Ma'araviim  congregation in Jerusalem, when he was 29 years old. Aburbeh also became a certified shochet (ritual slaughter) and bodek. He married his teacher's daughter, Rivka, in 1919; the couple had five sons and one daughter.
Aburbeh co-owned abookstore with his colleague Rabbi Yosef Yitzchak Shloush, head of the Ma'araviim congregation in Jerusalem. The bookstore sold Hebrew religious books and Judaica of which it also exported to North African Jewry and other communities in the Diaspora, such as Beirut, Lebanon. The store operated first in the Old City in Jerusalem (its catalogue indicates it was established in 1896) and later was relocated to the Mahane Yehuda neighborhood. Among the prayer books published in Jerusalem by Amram Aburbeh in 1933 is Siddur Shalom Yerushalem סדור שלום ירושלם כמנהג ק"ק ספרדים יוצאי המערב והמזרח   . In 1941  Siddur V'Ani Tefilah  סידור ואני תפלה כולל תפלות כל היום כמנהג ק"ק ספרדים was published; and in 1942 siddur  "Seder Tefilah: According to tradition of Sefaradim holy community, including daily Tefilot for year round"   סדר תפלה: ק"ק ספרדים, כולל תפלות לכל ימות השנה . In addition he sold Psalms books such as
 ספר תהלים מרום ציון עם באור המלות עם מקור הדמעה וחנוכת הבית 
.

Rabbi Amram Aburbeh received a license by the Government of Eretz Israel in 1942 to ship Etrogs abroad to the Jewish communities.  This was published in the Official Gazette of the Government, issue no. 1204, page 617. 

In addition to his occupation at the shop, Aburbeh taught at Porat Yosef Yeshiva and at Yeshivat Shaarey Zion, established by Chief Rabbi Ben-Zion Meir Hai Uziel. Uziel appointed Aburbeh as Chief Rabbi of the Nachlaot neighborhood in Jerusalem, where he served from 1925-1951. During the same time, Aburbeh was a dayan (religious court judge) for the Ma'araviim rabbinical court in Jerusalem, headed by Rabbi Ben-Zion Avraham Cuenca. In 1934 Aburbeh was appointed as shadar (funds emissary) on behalf of the Ma'araviim institutions in Jerusalem. He was dispatched to Morocco, where he successfully collected funds for a year. His return to Eretz Israel on September 6, 1934 was documented by the Jewish Agency administration as a registered passenger on the ship Roma 

In 1920 Aburbeh was among the founders of the new Jerusalem neighborhood of Bayit Vegan. In 1926 he founded and built a new synagogue in the Nachlaot neighborhood for the Ma'araviim congregation called Or Zaruaa, which he named after the beit midrash headed by his late father. This new synagogue included a beit midrash that he headed. Or Zaruaa Synagogue was chosen to be included as one of the buildings for preservation in Jerusalem.  In 1930 Aburbeh was elected as an executive committee  member of the Ma'araviim congregation in Jerusalem.

Rabbi Amram Aburbeh, a known philanthropist thanks to his multiple donations over the years 1940-1943 to the Sephardic General Orphanage in Jerusalem as his name appears among lists of two synagogues: The Avraham Memorial of the Ma'araviim congregation and Bayit VaGan of 100 mill (currency) and 50 mill (currency), respectively.
He was an active Zionist, and took part in the struggle to establish the state of Israel. The British Mandate authorities in Palestine arrested him due to his connections with the Haganah paramilitary organization. During this time, Aburbeh volunteered for the Mishmar Ha'Am (People's Guard). His sons were members of the Notrim police force and later served in the Israel Defense Forces.

An official publication Reshumot (Portofolio of Notifications 130) announcement on the election to Jerusalem municipality council, that were held on 14 November 1950, states that among the approved candidates Rabbi Amram Aburbeh was candidate number 7 to honor the Yichud Shevet Yehudah party candidates list, representing the religious Sephardi Jews.

In 1951 Aburbeh was elected by the Chief Rabbinate of Israel Council as Chief Rabbi of the Sephardic congregation of Petah Tikva. He served alongside the city's Ashkenazi chief rabbi, Rabbi Reuven Katz. Aburbeh gave lectures in several of Petah Tikva's downtown synagogues, including Beth Israel, Ohel Chaim, and Beit Avraham (called the "Great Sephardic Synagogue", which he founded). On Shabbat he gave lectures in additional neighborhoods. He was a member of the Chief Rabbinate of Israel Council and chairman of the National Rabbinical Council of the Sephardic community.

Aburbeh died on December 20, 1966 (7 Tevet 5727) in Petah Tikva and was buried in the Segula cemetery in that city beside his wife, Rivka.

Works
Netivei Am, Jerusalem customs, responsa and collected sermons, published in two volumes; Vol. 1 pub. 1963, Vol. 2 pub. 1966; second edition 1969.third edition 1977, fourth edition 1989, fifth edition 2006. sixth edition 2014   He received approbations for his sefarim from Rabbi Ovadia Hadaya, Rabb Ezra Attiya, Chief Rabbi Ovadia Yosef, and in later editions published by his sons Chief Rabbi Eliyahu Bakshi-Doron, Rabbi She'ar Yashuv Cohen, and Chief Rabbi Shlomo Amar; the latter was one of the last students to be rabbinically ordained by Aburbeh.  Chief Rabbi Yitzhak Yosef  cited from Netive Am book by Rabbi Amram Aburbeh , during a Rosh Hashanah lecture about the  Halakha concerning Ten Days of Repentance  prayers of Tefilat Amidah Shemoneh Esreh, Hamelech Hamishpat .

Aburbeh also edited the prayer book (siddur) Siddur Rinat Israel Rinat Yisrael Sephardic and Edot ha-Mizrach Nusach and composed a special prayer for the recovery of injured Israeli soldiers.

Selected articles

Memorials 

Memorials to Aburbeh were dedicated in several places and institutions in Israel:
 Netivei Am AMIT schools, in Beersheba and Yeruham Toranic and Scientific Education branches
 Netivei Am Street in the Ramot Alon neighbourhood of Jerusalem; Aburbeh Street in the Ein Ganim neighbourhood of Petah Tikva
 Beit Midrash Netivei Am in Beersheba

 Aburbeh Scholars Fund for Student Excellence
 Netivei Am organization to acquire rescue equipment
 Or Zaruaa Synagogue, Jerusalem, Israel unveiling of metal plate event honoring and commemorating Rabbi Amram Aburbeh as founder of the synagogue for the Ma'araviim community in Nachlaot neighbourhood with the participants Chief Rabbi Eliyahu Bakshi-Doron,and Chief Rabbi Shlomo Amar.
 A Sefer Torah was written as a memorial to honor Rabbi Amram Aburbeh and his wife Rivka. It was donated by their sons and daughter in 1968 to The Great Sephardic Synagogue in Petach Tikva called Beit Avraham. Later it was transferred to Mishkan Yonah synagogue in Petach Tikva. In 2017 this Torah scroll was borrowed by the synagogue of Arbel religious Elementary school in Nof HaGalil.

Gallery

Further reading 
"Zionism and the State of Israel as Viewed by Leading Sephardic-Oriental rabbis (1948-1967)", in On Both Sides Of The Bridge: Religion and State in the Early Years of Israel. Mordechay Bar-On and Zvi Zameret, eds. 2002. Jerusalem:Yad Ben Zvi.
Zvi Zohar on Rabbi Amram Aburbeh, in Daf LeTarbut Yehudit, Ministry of Education,  Aryeh Strikovski editor, vol. 277, 2008, pp. 54 – 58.
Zvi Zohar, The Luminous Face of the East: Studies in the Legal and Religious Thought of the Sephardic Rabbis of the Middle East. Tel Aviv: 2001. (Hebrew)
המסע לגילוי המנהג הספרדי-ירושלמי: הרב עמרם אבורביע ויצירתו נתיבי עם ("The Journey to Uncover the Sephardi-Yerushalmi Custom: Rabbi Amram Aburbeh and his Opus, Netivei Am"), in Rabbi Uzziel And His Contemporaries: Law, Leadership and Values, Zvi Zohar and Shalom Ratzabi eds. 2009, pp. 120–165.

 Neri Horovitz, "The Shas party and Zionism: Historical Analysis, New Directions", Judaism and Zionism Journal, vol. 2, 2000, pp. 30 – 60.
 Chachmey HaMa'arav BiYerushalayim חכמי המערב בירושלים: פרקים בתולדות חייהם ופעולותיהם של חכמי המערב (מרוקו) מהמאה הי"ט ועד ימינו ("Chachmey HaMa'arav BiYerushalayim Prakim BeToldot Chayehem VePeulotehem shel Chachmey HaMa'arav (Morocco) BiYerushalayim meHameah Ha19 VeAd Yamenu") pp.390-400, Shelomoh Dayan Editor. 1992. Jerusalem
 Shimon Reem, "Stories beyond tombstones in Petach Tikva". Amram Aburbeh p. 45. Shimon Reem editor, 2015.  Haifa
 "HaRambam Library,   "AMHASEFER Blog Manager. "Incredible events".Amram Aburbeh." December 26,2019. Tel Aviv.
 "Rabbi Amram Aburbeh ZTz'L" ספר אורח צדיקים חלק א' תולדות חייהם ומעשיהם של כמאה וחמישים מגדולי ישראל ("Orach Tzadikim Part 1 Toldot Chayehem U'Ma'aseyhem shel KeMeah VeChamishim MiGdoley Israel") pp.360-363, Daniel Moshe Elul Editor. 2003. Bet Shemesh.

References

External links 
 Website detailing the Aburbeh family (Hebrew)
 Petah-Tikva historic museum website – Rabbi Amaram Aburbeh (Hebrew)
 Petah Tikva History Archives and Museum   (Hebrew)
 Netivei Am, Volume I, first edition, 5724
 Netivei Am, Volume II, first edition, 5726
 Government of Israel official document stating a proof of Or Zaruaa Synagogue as building for preservation in Jerusalem
 Portofolio of Notifications officially published by the government of Israel announcement of approved candidates to Jerusalem council election
 Photo of Or Zaruaa synagogue
 Photo of entrance to Or Zaruaa synagogue
 160 Sephardic wisemen  
 Rabbi Amram Aburbeh 51 years memorial lecture, Arutz 7 
Historical Jewish Press HABOKER 16.05.1941 page 8 Rabbi Amram Aburbeh, Mahne Yehudah Jerusalem is licensed to check Tefillin and Mezuzahs
 Netivei-Am website
  MyHeritage website

1892 births
1966 deaths
20th-century rabbis in Jerusalem
Sephardic Haredi rabbis in Israel
People from Petah Tikva
Sephardi rabbis in Mandatory Palestine
Israeli Orthodox rabbis
Religious Zionist Orthodox rabbis
People from Tétouan
Moroccan emigrants to the Ottoman Empire